Banksia Island is a small island in the Montebello Islands, off the north-west coast of Western Australia. It is thought to be the "Banks Island" upon which the dipterist John Russell Malloch collected the type specimen for Lamprogaster indistincta, a species of signal fly, in 1928.

References
Banksia Island in the Gazetteer of Australia
Lamprogaster indistincta Malloch, 1928 in the Australian Faunal Directory

Montebello Islands archipelago